Emam Kandi (also Romanized as Emām Kandī) is a village in Qaleh Juq Rural District, Anguran District, Mahneshan County, Zanjan Province, Iran. At the 2006 census, its population was 167, in 40 families.

References 

Populated places in Mahneshan County